Pelegrina flaviceps is a species of jumping spider in the family Salticidae. It is found in the northeastern United States and southeastern Canada.

References

External links

 Pelegrina flaviceps at BugGuide.net

Salticidae
Articles created by Qbugbot
Spiders described in 1973